Dylów Rządowy  is a village in the administrative district of Gmina Pajęczno, within Pajęczno County, Łódź Voivodeship, in central Poland.

References

Villages in Pajęczno County